The Garnkirk and Glasgow Railway was an early railway built primarily to carry coal to Glasgow and other markets from the Monkland coalfields, shortening the journey and bypassing the monopolistic charges of the Monkland Canal; passenger traffic also developed early in the line's existence.

It opened officially on 27 September 1831 using horse traction, and had the track gauge of  that had been adopted by the Monkland and Kirkintilloch Railway, with which it was to connect.

It was dependent on the Monkland and Kirkintilloch Railway for access to the best areas of the coalfields, but eventually it by-passed this constraint by extending its line southwards through Coatbridge, enabling a direct link with another coal railway, the Wishaw and Coltness Railway. Widening its horizons it changed its name to the Glasgow, Garnkirk and Coatbridge Railway.

When the Caledonian Railway advanced on Glasgow, the Glasgow, Garnkirk and Coatbridge provided a ready-made access route, and the Caledonian company purchased the Garnkirk line.

Most of its original route remains open today.

Origins

In the eighteenth century, the city of Glasgow experienced increasing demand for coal, both for domestic and industrial purposes; the most convenient source was the Monkland coalfield, south of Airdrie, but the distance of over ten miles incurred considerable expense in the absence of an efficient means of transport. The Monkland Canal was opened in 1791, reducing the price of coal in Glasgow considerably. However a cartel of some of the coal owners attempted to keep prices artificially high, and from 1813 they managed to achieve a near-monopoly of the supply of Monkland coal, with the canal also charging monopolistic prices for carriage.

By 1823 the Monkland and Kirkintilloch Railway (M&KR) was being promoted, connecting the coalfield with the Forth and Clyde Canal at Kirkintilloch. Although this provided a route to Glasgow by-passing the Monkland Canal, "there seems little doubt that the principal intention of the M&KR promoters was the provision of a convenient route for Monkland coal to the Edinburgh market." Accordingly, it was the principal coal consumers in Glasgow who were dominant in proposing a railway to convey coal directly to Glasgow. The chief sponsors included Charles Tennant & Co, who had their St. Rollox chemical works at Townhead, Glasgow, adjacent to the Monkland Canal.

The railway was called The Garnkirk and Glasgow Railway, (G&GR) indicating the route and destination of the new railway; although there were extensive fireclay deposits at Garnkirk, it was not an important terminal of the new railway: most of the mineral traffic would originate on the M&KR system. The company was to have authorised capital of £28,497 17s 4d. The new company got its Act of Parliament on 26 May 1826, and the Act empowered it to make the necessary connection to the Monkland and Kirkintilloch Railway.

The Act stipulated that the company could not issue dividends of more than 10% unless they reduced their tolls to stated amounts. There was a decision to alter the course of the railway, and this involved an additional £11,000 capital.

The junction was to be at Bedlay (near modern Muirhead), and would have followed a more northerly route than that actually built. However the promoters decided it would be advantageous to shorten the extent of usage of the rival M&KR line, and to make the gradients more favourable to loaded traffic. Accordingly, a new Act was sought, and obtained on 14 June 1827, authorising the junction to be at Gartsherrie, and the Glasgow terminal to be at the "cut of junction" where the Monkland Canal and the Forth and Clyde Canal met. The amendment act also authorised increased capital of £9,350. Accordingly, the route was from the junction with the M&KR at Gartsherrie, near the Gargill Colliery, running via Gartcloss, Gartcosh, Garnkirk, Robroyston, Milton, Broomfield, Germiston, Rosebank and Pinkston to terminate at the Glasgow depot at Townhead. The Townhead depot was at the point where Keppochhill Road crossed the Forth and Clyde Canal. The M8 motorway and Springburn Road junction system has obliterated the site, but it was approximately at the present-day western end of Charles Street.

Construction
Contracts were swiftly let, and the first sod was cut on 28 August 1827. The engineers were Thomas Grainger and John Miller, who were also engineers to the M&KR.

The railway was planned to have gentle gradients and a good alignment, in contrast to the Monkland and Kirkintilloch line and other short mineral lines, and of the nearly  extent, the first (eastern)  were level and the remainder descended at 1 in 144. It was designed to be a locomotive line from the outset—a far-sighted decision, although it incurred considerable extra expense in heavier track construction.

This required heavy earthworks, with large embankments at Gartcloss, Gartcosh, Provanmill and Germiston, and deep cuttings at Gartcosh, Blackfauld and Provanmill.

The line was built to the  track gauge, which had been adopted by the M&KR; interchange of wagons with that line was essential.

Francis Whishaw, writing in 1839, stated that there were six level crossings on the line.

Construction was delayed by exceptionally bad weather, and the company had to obtain parliamentary authority for additional capital, which it obtained on 17 June 1830 for a further £21,150.

The first revenue traffic was carried in March 1831, when coal was sent eastwards from Gartcloss Colliery to the M&KR system, but during May 1831 horse-drawn coal trains from Monklands to Glasgow started operating.

Operation and traffic
Now following swiftly on from the opening, a passenger service was started on 1 June 1831, running from the G&GR Townhead terminus and Leaend, on the margin of Airdrie, on the Ballochney Railway, the trains operating intermediately over the M&KR. There were four journeys every day.

Moreover, Buchanan reported that:

Each time, also, the engine starts with a load of coals from the upper part of the line, or with empty waggons returning, a small passenger waggon is attached, not being regulated by any hour, and a considerable number of stragglers find their way in this manner along the line.

At the end of June 1831 the company's first locomotive entered service; it was named St Rollox and was a 2-2-0 of the Planet type, built by Robert Stephenson and Company, and was applied to the passenger service. The M&KR would not allow the locomotive on to their track, and the trains were horse-drawn from Gargill (Gartsherrie) eastwards.

This more modern type of locomotive again demonstrated the G&GR's dynamic thinking. A double line of rails was ready by September 1831, and on 27 September a ceremonial opening of the line took place.

Coal railways
The railway companies that opened in the Monklands and Glasgow area became known as the coal railways, marking both their primary traffic and their inter-dependency.

The G&GR company was dependent on the Monkland and Kirkintilloch line for originating traffic from the Monklands coalfield, and when the Wishaw and Coltness Railway (W&CR) opened in 1833, its traffic from further south passed over the M&K line too. Although the G&GR had planned for locomotive operation, there was evidently also significant horse-drawn traffic. The M&KR was seeking parliamentary authority to double their line, and the G&GR tried to get a clause giving them running powers to the Wishaw and Coltness line. The G&GR argued that when the M&K line was doubled, traffic for each direction should be allocated to each track; the G&GR argued that the two tracks should be allocated to locomotive use and (their own) horse-drawn trains respectively. There was clearly friction between the two companies, arising from horse-operated G&GR trains delaying M&KR locomotive trains.

However, by 1838 the G&GR was operating locomotives over the G&GR and the W&CR.

Passenger trains from Edinburgh
When the Slamannan Railway opened on 31 August 1840, it proposed a through passenger service between Edinburgh and Glasgow. The Slamannan company's eastern terminal was at Causeway, on the Union Canal, some distance from the capital. On 30 July 1840 the service started, involving a passage on the canal from Port Hopetoun in Edinburgh; traversing the Slamannan company's line, which included a rope-worked incline at Causewayend; the Ballochney Railway, including the double rope-worked inclined place at Commonhead; the Monkland & Kirkintilloch Railway between Kipps at Gartsherrie; and the G&GR itself.

For a while this transit was the prime route between Edinburgh and Glasgow (Townhead), taking about five hours. It lasted until February 1842 when the Edinburgh and Glasgow Railway opened, putting paid to any through traffic over the Slamannan route.

Mixed locomotive and horse operation led to difficulties; in 1840 the company drew up byelaws laying down that passenger trains in both directions should share one track with eastbound (i.e. unloaded) horse trains, and the other dedicated to westbound, loaded, horse trains. Waggons were always to give way to passenger trains and to locomotives, and were not to start on a journey unless certain of reaching a siding before being overtaken. (It is not clear how they could know this in the absence even of primitive telecommunications.)

By the first half of 1845, the company was carrying all the coal traffic on its line, while outside carriers conveyed 19% of "other goods".

In this period, attention was being drawn to the high cost of operation of the line; in 1839 - 1843 gross revenue was £15,337 and working expenditure was 51.3% of that sum.

The Glasgow, Garnkirk and Coatbridge Railway

Friction between the G&GR and the neighbouring M&KR developed. The M&KR passenger station at Coatbridge ("The Howes") was constantly complained of by the G&GR as being a deterrent to passengers. A more fundamental issue was the intensive traffic over the M&KR section, crossing a junction of main roads at Coatbridge. Moreover, the Wishaw and Coltness Railway (W&CR) relied on the M&KR section to convey coal from its line to the G&GR. The M&KR refused to allow locomotives on its line, even though the two other railways used them routinely.

At length the G&GR decided to build its own independent line paralleling, and by-passing, the M&KR, and connecting directly with the W&CR line. When it sought parliamentary authority it changed its name to the more appropriate Glasgow, Garnkirk and Coatbridge Railway (GG&CR). It was formed on 19 July 1844.

Running north-south between Gartsherrie and Whifflet, and to the west of the M&KR line, the new route opened in July 1845. It crossed the Monkland Canal and Bank Street in Coatbridge by a bridge, and it crossed the M&KR Rosehall branch on the level. There was a new Coatbridge station, which much later became .

The Caledonian Railway
From 1844 business interests were promoting the idea of a new railway from Carlisle to both Edinburgh and Glasgow. The Caledonian Railway offered considerable extra traffic, by connecting to the Wishaw and Coltness line at Garriongill, and continuing to Glasgow over it and the GG&CR. As the Caledonian line was to be standard gauge, this was obviously contingent on those railways changing their gauge to suit. In fact all the coal railways decided to change in concert, and did probably on 26 August 1847 and for a few  days after. There was a miners' strike at this time, so the cessation of mineral traffic for the work was not as difficult as it might have been.

The Caledonian Railway pursued its plans to enter Glasgow, and also to reach Stirling and Perth by building from near Gartsherrie to meet the projected Scottish Central Railway at Greenhill. The Caledonian negotiated to acquire both the W&CR and the GG&CR, and in fact it leased the GG&CR from 1 January 1846. On 3 August 1846 an Act of Parliament was obtained for amalgamation, and final amalgamation occurred on 29 June 1865.

The GG&CR company was not dissolved until 2 August 1880.

References

Notes

Sources
 
 Cunnison, J. and Gilfillan, J.B.S., (1958). The Third Statistical Account of Scotland: Glasgow. Glasgow: William Collins Sons & Co. Ltd.
 
 Little, M., (1979). Greater Glasgow's Railway Network. In: Scottish Transport, 33, Scottish Tramway Museum Society. ISSN 0048-9808.

Further reading

External links
 RAILSCOT on Glasgow and Garnkirk Railway
 Historical, 1846, article on Monkland referring to coal, ironstone and canal and railway transportation.
 

Early Scottish railway companies
Caledonian Railway
Horse-drawn railways
Mining railways
Transport in Glasgow
Transport in North Lanarkshire
4 ft 6 in gauge railways in Scotland
Pre-grouping British railway companies
Railway companies established in 1826
Railway lines opened in 1831
Railway companies disestablished in 1844
1826 establishments in Scotland
1844 disestablishments in Scotland
British companies established in 1826
British companies disestablished in 1844
Coal in Scotland